The Huntington Cubs was a minor league baseball team located in Huntington, West Virginia.  The team played in the Appalachian League, and was affiliated with the Chicago Cubs. Their home stadium was St. Cloud Commons.

See also
Huntington Cubs players

References

Defunct Appalachian League teams
Sports in Huntington, West Virginia
Professional baseball teams in West Virginia
Chicago Cubs minor league affiliates
1990 establishments in West Virginia
1994 disestablishments in West Virginia
Baseball teams established in 1990
Baseball teams disestablished in 1994
Defunct baseball teams in West Virginia